Dwarf Hotot is a breed of domestic rabbit characterized by an entirely white coat, except for a circle of another color around each eye.

History

The Dwarf Hotot is one of the more recent breeds to be recognized by the ARBA, gaining acceptance in 1983.  It has never been without a strong following, but also has never been among the most popular breeds.  There's an unusual story behind this breed's development.

The much larger Blanc de Hotot was produced in the early 1900s in an effort to produce a black-eyed white rabbit for meat and fur. In that era, large rabbits were valued for their commercial value. But in later years, big bunnies went out of style and people started pursuing dwarf breeds.

In the 1970s, one breeder in East Germany and one in West Germany started working on a Dwarf Hotot, completely independent of one another.   One crossed a REW Netherland Dwarf to a Blanc de Hotot; the other didn't use a standard Hotot at all, but crossed a black Netherland Dwarf to a Dutch and bred out markings until only the eyebands remained.  The two strains were eventually united to produce the breed we know today.

This “eye of the fancy” is of compact type and has a gentle rollback coat.  Unlike the Polish, which as similar body type, the shoulders are supposed to be as wide as the hips, and not show any taper. The head set is not as high on the shoulders as that of a Netherland Dwarf, but should not rest on the table either.  The head is bold and broad.  Ears are carried in an upright V shape, and are disqualified if over 2 ¾ inches in length.    The eyes are encircled with narrow bands of colored fur.  Ideal eyeband width equals the thickness of two pennies, and the bands of color are even all around the eye.  Weak or streaky eyebands are faulted, but a complete break in the band is disqualified.

For many years, the only accepted variety was white with black eyebands. In the year 2006, chocolate banded Dwarf Hotots were accepted by the ARBA.  The black and chocolate banded bunnies are shown together, but the color must be specified on the registration forms.  Blue-band Dwarf Hotots have also been in development, and are currently in the process of being accepted by the ARBA. 

The Dwarf Hotot is strictly a fancy breed.  At 3 pounds max, they are too small to be of commercial value. 

Temperaments can range from outgoing to moody, but as a rule they are friendly rabbits and well suited to a pet life.
Dwarf Hotot Bunnies are friendly, outgoing and energetic. They make great pets and emotional support animals.

See also

 List of rabbit breeds

References

External links
Dwarf Hotot Rabbit Breed History
Different Breeds of Rabbits

Rabbit breeds originating in Germany
Rabbits as pets